Calvin Eugene Sweeney (born January 12, 1955) is a former professional American football wide receiver in the National Football League (NFL) for the Pittsburgh Steelers. He won Super Bowl XIV with the team over the Los Angeles Rams. He played football at Perris High in Perris, CA before playing college football at the University of Southern California. He is noted for having caught the last pass thrown by Steelers Hall of Fame quarterback Terry Bradshaw for a touchdown on December 10, 1983.

References

1955 births
Living people
American football wide receivers
UC Riverside Highlanders football players
USC Trojans football players
Pittsburgh Steelers players
Players of American football from Riverside, California
People from Perris, California